West of Dodge City is a 1947 American Western film directed by Ray Nazarro and written by Bert Horswell. The film stars Charles Starrett, Nancy Saunders, Mustard, Gravy and Smiley Burnette. The film was released on March 27, 1947, by Columbia Pictures.

Plot

Cast           
Charles Starrett as Steve Ramsey / The Durango Kid
Nancy Saunders as Anne Avery
Mustard as Mustard
Gravy as Gravy 
Smiley Burnette as Smiley Burnette 
Fred F. Sears as Henry Hardison
Glenn Stuart as Danny Avery
I. Stanford Jolley as Borger
George Chesebro as Hod Barker
Robert J. Wilke as Adams
Nolan Leary as John Avery
Steve Clark as Sheriff
Zon Murray as Dirk
Marshall Reed as Flint
Tom Chatterton as Officer manager
Bud Osborne as Stage driver

References

External links
 

1947 films
1940s English-language films
American Western (genre) films
1947 Western (genre) films
Columbia Pictures films
Films directed by Ray Nazarro
American black-and-white films
1940s American films